Journey to the Light is the second album by the Detroit, Michigan R&B group Brainstorm. It was released in 1978 on Tabu Records and produced by Jerry Peters.

Track listing
"We're on Our Way Home, Pt. 1" - (Gerald Kent)  3:45
"Loving Just You" - (Larry Sims)  4:31
"Every Time I See You, I Go Wild!" - (Henry Cosby, Sylvia Moy, Stevie Wonder)  7:02
"Brand New Day" 	(Kent, Charles Overton) 3:53
"Journey to the Light" - (Jeryl Bright)  5:40
"If You Ever Need to Cry" (Belita Woods, William L. Wooten)  6:31
"We're on Our Way Home, Pt. 2" - (Gerald Kent)  2:50
"Positive Thinking" - (Deon Estus)  4:43
"Journey to the Light" [Disco Version] 	(Jeryl Bright) 	5:40

Personnel
Belita Woods - lead vocals
Deon Estus - bass
Renell Gonsalves - drums, percussion
Gerald Kent - guitar
William L. Wooten III - piano, Fender Rhodes electric piano, synthesizer
Trenita Womack - flute, percussion
Jeryl Bright - trombone, percussion, backing vocals
Larry Sims - trumpet, flugelhorn
Charles Overton - alto, tenor and soprano saxophone, backing vocals

Charts

References

External links
 Brainstorm-Journey To The Light at Discogs

1978 albums
Albums produced by Jerry Peters
Tabu Records albums
Albums recorded at Total Experience Recording Studios